Drunella is a genus of spiny crawler mayflies in the family Ephemerellidae. There are at least 20 described species in Drunella.

Species
These 25 species belong to the genus Drunella.

References

Further reading

 
 
 
 
 
 
 

Mayflies